Felicity Tamasyn "Flick" Palmateer (born 4 August 1992)  is an Australian professional surfer who competes at the World Surf League.

Early life
Palmateer was born in Perth, Western Australia. She spent her childhood on the beaches of Western Australia surfing with her father, Warrick Palmateer, and two younger brothers.  She was  12 years old when she competed in her first surf contest. Palmateer's parents, both artists, encouraged and supported her twin careers of art and surfing.

Career
In 2015 Palmateer rode the biggest wave ever ridden by a female Australian surfer at Cowaramup Bombora (aka Cow Bombie) off the coast of Margaret River, south of Perth.

In 2016, she was invited to compete in the Pe'ahi Women's Challenge on the island of Maui.

Career Highlights

Source

Sponsors 
Palmateer's sponsors have included Billabong, Channel Islands Surfboards, Future Fins, The Surfboard Room.

Television appearances 
In 2021, Palmateer competed on Australian Survivor: Brains V Brawn. In 2023, she appeared on Australian Survivor: Heroes V Villains as a member of the Heroes tribe.

Personal life
Palmateer came out as bisexual on Instagram and has identified as such since 2010.
During filming of Australian Survivor: Brains V Brawn, Palmateer's mother passed away from younger onset frontotemporal dementia. In March 2023, Palmateer was chosen to be an ambassador for non-profit organisation Dementia Australia.

References

External links
Facebook
Instagram

1992 births
Living people
Australian female surfers
Sportspeople from Perth, Western Australia
Sportspeople from the Gold Coast, Queensland
Australian Survivor contestants
Australian LGBT sportspeople
Bisexual women
Bisexual sportspeople